Bifrost is a French science fiction magazine that is published every three months. It was first published in April 1996.

References

1996 establishments in France
Literary magazines published in France
French-language magazines
French science fiction
Magazines established in 1996
Science fiction magazines
Triannual magazines